Many Mouths Shut! is the sixth studio album by the Serbian Irish folk/Celtic rock band Orthodox Celts, released in 2017.

Many Mouths Shut! was preceded by the singles "Save Me", released in March 2014, and "One / Milk & Honey", released in March 2015. The album featured seven songs authored by the band and six covers of traditional Irish songs. It was produced by the band member Dejan Lalić and released through the band's own label, O'Celts Records. The album artwork, depicting members of the band as convicts in the Wild West, was designed by Italian comic book artist Walter Venturi.

Track list

Personnel
Aleksandar Petrović – vocals
Dejan Lalić - mandolin, mandola, tenor banjo, electric guitar, backing vocals, producer
Vladan Jovković - acoustic guitar, backing vocals, engineer, design
Nikola Stanojević - violin
Bojan Petrović - whistles, backing vocals
Dejan Grujić - bass, keyboards, backing vocals, engineer
Dušan Živanović - drums, bodhrán, accordion

Additional personnel
Nikola Vranjković - electric guitar, engineer
Stevan Vitas - keyboards
Walter Venturi - artwork
Marina Bešenski - design

References

Many Mouths Shut! at Discogs

External links
Many Mouths Shut! at Discogs

Orthodox Celts albums
2017 albums